Dária Fabrici was crowned Miss Slovak Republic 2013 first runner up on a nationwide pageant held at Slovak Republic. She was elected to represent Slovak Republic at the Miss Earth 2014.

Life and career
Dária was a 20-year-old student of University of Presov. She came from Kosice. She loves traveling, modeling, sports, cooking, and bathing.

Category
Miss Earth 2014
Miss Slovak Republic

References

External links
 Miss Earth Official Website

Miss Earth 2014 contestants
Slovak beauty pageant winners
Living people
Year of birth missing (living people)
People from Košice